Rhonny Nilsson (born 3 July 1958) is a retired Swedish football midfielder.

Nilsson played nearly a decade in IK Brage before making his move to Norway. Nilsson was ever-present in Sogndal's first-tier seasons in 1989, 1991 and 1992, amassing 66 Eliteserien games. After the 1993 season he left to take one year in Raufoss IL and one year in IL Jotun.

References

1958 births
Living people
Swedish footballers
IK Brage players
Sogndal Fotball players
Raufoss IL players
Swedish expatriate footballers
Expatriate footballers in Norway
Swedish expatriate sportspeople in Norway
Allsvenskan players
Eliteserien players
Norwegian First Division players
Association football midfielders